Marabunta is a fully distributed software application for anonymous P2P. The main goal is the fight against internet censorship and assuring the freedom of speech. It is a peer-to-peer platform for information exchange among nodes in an anonymous way based on several communication algorithms called "Order and Chaos" which can be found in massive social organizations such as ant colonies.

The project was founded at the University of Zaragoza, Spain, developed and promoted by students of computing engineering although development teams and users from many different places have shown interest, perhaps attracted by the ideological aims of the project. The software is available in Spanish and English, the website is also available in English.

Marabunta uses the Qt graphical widget toolkit, allowing it to be used on both Linux and Microsoft Windows. Released under the GNU General Public License, Marabunta is free software.

Purpose 

Marabunta is an implementation of the ideas explained in the "Free Nets project " and it has been developed with these ideas in mind:

 Avoiding censure: Communication between people avoiding central servers is allowed. So it is free from censure attacks, which are commonly launched from many governments and corporations that want to control the communications.
 Anonymity: A degree of anonymous communication is made possible, such that information can be accessed without knowledge of its original source.
 Motives and development: Marabunta is the first project of this kind developed in Spain (first version released in 2005). Still, the software has potential use by people anywhere in the world, especially in countries with little or no freedom of speech.

Features 

There are many potential services that can be run on top of Marabunta. Text message interchange is the first service. It could be taken as a platform for telegram distribution, where each computer in the net works as a host and as a server.

 As a host: messages are sent, active nodes are sought, etc.
 As a server: text messages and requests to increase the connectivity between nodes are routed to the network using a broadcast forwarding method.

There are four message distribution lists, so receivers only receive messages sent to the list they are interested in: General, Technology, Philosophy, and Politics.

Content filters are allowed so only messages with certain patterns are displayed. This is specially useful when searching for some specific information because Marabunta just selects potentially interesting messages.

Connections 

All generated traffic uses the UDP/IP protocols. Avoiding setting up connections between nodes lets more traffic flow in the network and the operational redundancy of every node can be used. Moreover, the UDP protocol could be seen as increasing the anonymity in the net because there is no need to validate source hosts to receive a datagram.

Port-forwarding on NATs 

Marabunta does not support UDP hole punching, so users behind NATs have to establish a port forwarding route to let the router know to which port and node of the internal net it should forward the arriving datagrams.

References

External links 
  Marabunta home page (Software does display in Spanish by default. To set in English : run the software, click the tab "Opciones Generales", area "Seleccion de Idioma" (bottom of the window), change from "Castellano" to "English").

Anonymity networks
Anonymous file sharing networks
Cross-platform free software
Free communication software
Free file sharing software
Free instant messaging clients
Free multilingual software
Internet privacy software
Peer-to-peer computing
File sharing software that uses Qt
Windows file sharing software
File sharing software for Linux
Free software programmed in C++